The Midvalley Connector (also known as the Taylorsville-Murray BRT) is a planned bus rapid transit (BRT) line anticipated to run between Murray and West Valley City (passing through Taylorsville) in Utah, United States, that will be operated by the Utah Transit Authority (UTA). It will connect the main campus of Salt Lake Community College (SLCC) in Taylorsville with both the TRAX light rail system and the FrontRunner commuter rail. It is the fourth of several BRT lines that UTA is planning in Utah County and the Salt Lake Valley. Bus Rapid Transit is described by UTA as "light rail on rubber tires".

Description
The Midvalley Connector will connect Murray Central station with the West Valley Central station, connecting with the Intermountain Medical Center, Sorensen Research Park, Salt Lake Community College Taylorsville Redwood Campus, and the Calvin Rampton Complex (which houses the Utah Department of Transportation, the Utah Department of Public Safety Driver License Division, and the Department of Technology Services) along the way. About a fifth of the approximately  route will be in dedicated lanes along 4500/4700 South (Taylorsville Expressway/SR-266) with the other four-fifths running along various city streets. There are fifteen planned stops for the line. It is currently planned to begin construction Spring 2023.

Route
UTA has not yet assigned a route number to the Midvalley Connector.

Murray
The Midvalley Connector will begin its route at Murray Central Station, with its connections to the Red and Blue TRAX lines and FrontRunner (at the adjacent Murray station), in an expanded bus bay. It will exit at the intersection of Cottonwood Street and 100 West, turning north onto Cottonwood Street. It will continue by turning west onto Vine Street. After crossing over the railroad tracks, it will reach the Vine Street stop on the western side of the intersection with Commerce Drive. From there it will cross over Interstate 15 and turn north onto Murray Boulevard, and reach the next stop at approximately 5030 South on Murray Boulevard. After continuing north, it will use 4800 South/Murray Taylorsville Road to turn east and cross the Jordan River and the Jordan River Parkway Trail.

Taylorsville
Upon crossing the Jordan River, the Midvalley Connector will leave Murray and enter Taylorsville. It will immediately turn north onto Sunstone Road, following the road to the northeast and reaching a stop halfway down the road. At the end of Sunstone Road, it will turn north onto Atherton Drive, which is also the road where the next stop is located, at approximately 4595 South (outside Monte Vista). Upon reaching the end of Atherton Drive, it will turn west onto 4500/4700 South and enter the dedicated guideways, in addition to immediately reaching its next stop, the first of three located in the median of the road.

It will continue down 4500/4700 South in dedicated lanes until reaching Redwood Road (SR 68), stopping at more stops in the median along the way, with one at the west intersection of Atherton Drive, and the other at approximately 1300 West (outside of the Fore Lakes Golf Course). It will continue by turning north onto Redwood Road (exiting the dedicated lanes) then east onto Community Boulevard to reach a new transit hub in the south east corner of the Salt Lake Community College Campus. From there it will leave SLCC the way it came in in order to continue west on 4700 South. The route will have one more stop in Taylorsville, on 4700 South at 2200 West.

West Valley City
The Midvalley Connector will leave Taylorsville and enter West Valley by crossing under Interstate 215 and turning north onto 2700 West. The route will continue north on 2700 West, with 4 stops at approximately 4700 S (near the Calvin Rampton Complex), 4400 S (near the state complex and the American Express offices), 4100 South, and 3800 South. The route will reach its end by turning east onto 3650 South and entering West Valley Central Station, with its connection to the Green TRAX line.

The route from West Valley to Murray is the same with the one exception that the eastbound stop at the east intersection of 4500/4700 South and Atherton Drive is on the side, rather than the median.

Stops
Initially fifteen stops are planned for the Midvalley Connector.

See also

 Utah Transit Authority Bus Rapid Transit

Notes

References

External links

 Midvalley Connector Project Website
 Bus Rapid Transit fact sheet
 Official UTA website

Bus rapid transit in Utah
Transportation in Salt Lake County, Utah
Utah Transit Authority